Nam Angels is a 1989 Philippine biker Vietnam war film directed by Cirio H. Santiago and written by Dan Gagliasso. The film was released in West Germany as Hell's Angels in Vietnam.

Plot
During the Vietnam War an American patrol engages in a firefight with a strong force of NVA regulars. The Americans fight their way into a cave containing gold that is in the territory of aboriginals who kill the NVA as well as a few Americans, but capture the majority of the patrol with the exception of its leader, Lt. Vance Calhoun.

Calhoun beseeches his commanding general to allow him to return to the area to rescue his men, but the General explains they have no resources, and the area will be bombed by B-52s in a few days time. Aware that four Hells Angels bikers are visiting Vietnam and had have been arrested and had their motorcycles confiscated, Calhoun gets the General to allow him to release the Hell's Angels to be under his command to rescue his patrol. In exchange for their services, he offers the Angels a share of the gold but does not mention the prisoners.

After fighting their way through NVA held territory with the aid of friendly South Vietnamese, they discover the aborigines are led by a German named Chard who has remained in Indochina since his French Foreign Legion service. Chard plans to sell his American prisoners to the NVA.

Cast
 Brad Johnson as Lt. Vance Calhoun
 Vernon Wells as Chard
 Mark Venturini as Bonelli
 Kevin Duffis  as Hickman
 Rick Dean as Larger
 Jeff Griffith as Carmody
 Romy Diaz as Turko
 Ken Metcalfe as Gen. Donipha
 Archi Adamos as Trinh
 Eric Hahn as Morey

Hells Angels lawsuit
On October 26, 1989, the Hells Angels Motorcycle Club filed a federal trademark infringement lawsuit in Los Angeles against Concorde-New Horizons, which produced Nam Angels, and against Media Home Entertainment, which distributed the film on video, over infringements on the club's registered trademarks. Hells Angels spokesman George Christie said: "There is absolutely no way our board or membership would have approved the portrayal of the Hells Angels in this movie. In fact, the portrayal of our members as disloyal to each other is totally contrary to the most important values of our organization – loyalty and trust". He further stated: "We have a structure in place for negotiating commercial licensing arrangements and we would be perfectly amenable to working with any enterprise interested in using Hells Angels trademarks within the guidelines we've established." Barry Fischer, the Hells Angels' Century City-based attorney who filed the suit, claimed: "I have never seen a movie where the trademark infringement was so pervasive. The most important thing to the Hells Angels is that the movie be stopped. I'm not saying the damages aren't important, but they are secondary to having the film pulled." A spokesman for Concorde-New Horizons responded that "the lawsuit is unfounded". The suit was ultimately settled out of court.

References

External links 
 

Vietnam War films
1989 films
Outlaw biker films
Films shot in the Philippines
1989 action films
American action war films
1980s war films
Philippine war drama films
1980s English-language films
Films directed by Cirio H. Santiago
1980s American films
Philippine action drama films
Hells Angels